Matías Alberto Mansilla (born 21 January 1996) is an Argentine professional footballer who plays as a central midfielder for Deportivo Municipal.

Career
Mansilla made his professional football debut with Rosario Central in October 2016, featuring for the final minutes of a 1–1 draw against Huracán in the Argentine Primera División. He made four further appearances during the 2016–17 season. On 14 August 2017, Mansilla signed for Primera B Nacional's Quilmes on loan. In total, he featured on thirteen occasions for Quilmes as they finished twelfth. In January 2019, Mansilla was announced as a new player for Peruvian Segunda División side Santos. His first senior goal arrived in the succeeding June versus Juan Aurich.

2020 saw Mansilla join Peruvian Primera División team Deportivo Municipal; again teaming up with Renzo Alfani, who was also his teammate at Rosario and Santos.

Career statistics
.

References

External links

1996 births
Living people
People from General Roca
Argentine footballers
Association football midfielders
Argentine expatriate footballers
Expatriate footballers in Peru
Argentine expatriate sportspeople in Peru
Argentine Primera División players
Primera Nacional players
Peruvian Segunda División players
Peruvian Primera División players
Rosario Central footballers
Quilmes Atlético Club footballers
Santos de Nasca players
Deportivo Municipal footballers